is a railway freight terminal in Kamisu, Ibaraki Prefecture, Japan, operated by the Kashima Rinkai Railway.

Lines
It is located next to the rolling stock depot for the Kashima Rinkai Railway.

History

The terminal opened on 12 November 1970. The platform was also used by passenger trains operating between Kita-Kashima Station (now Kashima Soccer Stadium) and Kashimakōnan Station (now closed) between 25 July 1978 and 1 December 1983.

References

Railway stations in Ibaraki Prefecture
Stations of Kashima Rinkai Railway